Postal codes in Taiwan is a system of three + three digits used by Chunghwa Post.  There are 368 sets of three-digit codes for townships, county-administered cities, and districts in Taiwan.

The cities of Chiayi and Hsinchu have a single code covering all their districts. The uninhabited islands Pratas (Dongsha) and Spratly (Nansha) each have a single code. The uninhabited Senkaku Islands (Diaoyutai) (administered by Japan) have a code, but there are no deliveries. 

Omitting the supplementary three digits is ordinarily acceptable, but using a six-digit code will speed the delivery of the mail.

Change from 3+2 to 3+3 postal codes 

The official launch of three + three digit postal codes occurred on March 3, 2020, in order to support more fine grained delivery section codes. The initial three digit division codes remain unchanged, only the supplemental two digits were updated to three digits. The previous three + two digit system had been in service for 29 years, since February 1, 1991.

As of November 2020, three + two digit postal codes are still in common use and accepted by the post office. A significant proportion of forms and systems provide space for only three + two digit postal codes.

There are apps for Android and iOS/iPadOS to look up the 3+3 postal codes.

Large Postal Code Zones 
The first digit is for a large postal zone:

Notes 
Of the disputed territories, it is practically possible to send mail to Pratas Island (Tungsha/Dongsha) (817) and Taiping Island, the largest island of the Spratly Islands (819), as those are above sea level and controlled by Taiwan. There is no mail delivery to the Diaoyutai Islands (290), as they are controlled by Japan and have been uninhabited for many decades.

See also
 List of postal codes

References

External links
Chunghwa Post's ZIP code finder for Taiwan
Basis of official spellings

Taiwan
Postal codes
Taiwan
Postal system of Taiwan
Postal codes